Peter Mackin (sometimes Machin) (1878 – 9 April 1917) was an English professional footballer who played in the Football League for Lincoln City as an inside right.

Career
An inside right, Mackin had a long career in non-League football in his native North East, most notably with North Eastern League club Blyth Spartans. He scored 21 goals in 54 Football League appearances for Lincoln City.

Personal life 
Mackin was married with five children and worked as a shipyard labourer in Hebburn, Wallsend and Blyth. He served as a private in the Royal Northumberland Fusiliers during the First World War and was wounded on the first day on the Somme. Mackin was killed during the Battle of Vimy Ridge on 9 April 1917. He was buried in Roclincourt Military Cemetery.

Honours 
Blyth Spartans
 Northern Football Alliance: 1908–09
 Tynemouth Infirmary Cup: 1908–09, 1909–10
Bedlington United
 Tynemouth Infirmary Cup: 1910–11

References 

1878 births
1917 deaths
Footballers from Gateshead
English footballers
Association football inside forwards
Hebburn Argyle F.C. players
Sunderland A.F.C. players
Lincoln City F.C. players
Blyth Spartans A.F.C. players
Bedlington United A.F.C. players
Military personnel from County Durham
Ashington A.F.C. players
Willington Athletic F.C. players
Newburn F.C. players
English Football League players
British Army personnel of World War I
Royal Northumberland Fusiliers soldiers
British military personnel killed in World War I